Francisco Antonio Rodríguez Poveda (born 24 November 1938 in Herrera Province) was provisional President of Panama in 1989.

Provisional President of Panama

Rodríguez became provisional President of Panama on 1 September 1989 following resignation of Manuel Solís Palma. He stood down on 20 December 1989 following the United States invasion of Panama and the arrest of de facto leader Manuel Antonio Noriega. He was one of a series of Noriega's puppet rulers, nicknamed the "Kleenex presidents" in Panama due to their "disposability".

Later life

In 1994, he was pardoned by President Guillermo Endara for any crimes committed during the Noriega years. Rodríguez belonged to the Democratic Revolutionary Party (PRD).

See also
 Manuel Noriega#De facto rule of Panama

References

 	
 	

1938 births
Living people
Presidents of Panama
Democratic Revolutionary Party politicians